Myrl Howard Shoemaker (April 14, 1913 – July 30, 1985) was an American politician of the Democratic party who served as the 57th lieutenant governor of Ohio from 1983 until his death in 1985.

Shoemaker served for 24 years in the Ohio House of Representatives before being elected lieutenant governor in 1982 as running mate of Dick Celeste. Celeste's choice of Shoemaker for Lieutenant Governor was pivotal for him to receive downstate support in the election to offset the political support of his opponent, U.S. Rep. Clarence J. "Bud" Brown Jr. Wags claimed that if elected, Celeste would be the Governor above Interstate 70 and Shoemaker would be the Governor below Interstate 70, the highway that bisects Ohio.

Shoemaker died of cancer in 1985 while serving as lieutenant governor.

His son Mike Shoemaker succeeded him in the state house, and went on to serve in the Ohio State Senate.

The Convocation center on the campus of the University of Cincinnati bears his name. The main arena has been sponsored by Fifth Third Bank since 2005, and is legally named "Fifth Third Arena at Shoemaker Center".

External links

Democratic Party members of the Ohio House of Representatives
Lieutenant Governors of Ohio
1913 births
1985 deaths
Deaths from cancer in Ohio
20th-century American politicians